BBC Midlands (known as the Midland Region from 1927 until c. 1974) is the BBC English Region producing local radio and web content for Herefordshire, Shropshire, Staffordshire, Warwickshire, the West Midlands, and Worcestershire.
Although the region has been unofficially called BBC West Midlands since BBC East Midlands became a separate region in 1991, it retains the BBC Midlands name and brand, with its history dating from 1927, for public use.

Services

Television
The BBC Midlands region carries a number of regional programmes today. The regular schedule consists of the flagship Midlands Today news programme, regional news bulletins, the weekly regional magazine programme Inside Out and a twenty-minute opt-out during Sunday Politics.

Radio
The region is the controlling centre for BBC WM, BBC Coventry and Warwickshire, BBC Hereford and Worcester, BBC Radio Stoke and BBC Radio Shropshire.
    
Some of this programming is simulcast with the radio stations in the BBC East Midlands region, and overnight BBC Radio 5 Live is simulcast.

Online and Interactive
BBC West Midlands also produces regional news and local radio pages for Ceefax (retired after the digital switchover in 2012), BBC Red Button and BBC Local News websites for each county.

History

Early years
BBC Midlands is the oldest of the BBC English Regions, having been formed (as the Midland Region) in 1927, when the new Borough Hill high-powered radio transmitter at Daventry became the first to replace the earlier lower-powered city-based radio stations, such as Birmingham's 5IT, and make regional and national broadcasting a technical possibility.

The Daventry transmitter broadcast two channels, and as further regional transmission stations followed (starting with London's Brookmans Park in 1929), this quickly established the pattern for pre-war broadcasting. 5XX from Daventry (later – from 7 October 1934 – from Droitwich) carried the BBC National Programme originating in London, while 5GB broadcast the BBC Regional Programme, the regional controller of which was free to schedule, as he saw fit, a mix of networked programming from London, regional programmes produced by the Birmingham base, and items taken from the output of other regions.

The first director of the new Midland regional service was Percy Edgar, who had been the announcer and Head of Programming for 5IT on its opening night in 1922 and was to be the dominant figure in Midlands broadcasting from its birth until 1945. Edgar was a strong believer in the value of local production and fought to establish the Midland Region as an independent source of programming, pioneering community-focussed initiatives such as the Midland Parliament programme, where members of the public debated controversial issues on air with major public figures.

By 1935, the BBC's Midland Region covered an area extending from The Potteries to Norfolk and was producing 40% of its broadcast output itself - a greater proportion even than that of BBC Scotland. With 14 producers, it was the largest BBC department outside London.

The television era
Regional radio was suspended during World War II, but in July 1945, the BBC Home Service was launched on a similar regional basis to the pre-war Regional Programme. The Midlands Region continued under new director Dennis Morris in the independent and innovative vein established by Edgar – pioneering on-air listener feedback with Listeners Answer Back in 1946 and launching the longest-running and most popular programme in the history of radio – The Archers – at the beginning of 1951.

Despite these successes, two technological developments gradually started to make the old regional system untenable. The development of FM radio made it possible to fit a far greater number of channels into the spectrum without conflict and interference, which opened the possibility of more towns and cities having their own radio stations. The Midlands Region opened the BBC's first local radio station, BBC Radio Leicester, in 1967, and with many more of these planned, the relevance of the regional radio station broadcasting from the Welsh border to the North Sea was immediately cast into doubt.

Television was also presenting more of a threat than an opportunity. Although the Midlands had been the first area outside London to receive television coverage with the opening of the Sutton Coldfield transmitting station in 1949, the greater cost of television production compared to radio meant that it was always going to be a more centralised service.

A television studio was opened in Birmingham in 1950 and early successes included Come Dancing in 1949 – the first regionally produced television programme to establish itself as a regular in the national network schedule - and Midlands Today in 1964, one of the UK's first daily regional news programmes. Regional television had been established in 1957 with the launch of local evening news bulletins. Although it fared better than the struggling BBC North or BBC West (which was threatened for a while with being absorbed by the Midlands Region), it was clear that if BBC Midlands was too large to be truly local in the radio market, it was equally too small to be as self-sufficient across the full range of television programming as it had been in radio.

Division of the Region
The result was the radical shakeup that took place following the publication of the Broadcasting in the Seventies report in 1969. The eastern part of the region was reborn as the Norwich-based BBC East, with both it and the smaller remaining BBC Midlands focussing entirely on regional television (primarily regional news) and local radio. Regional radio ceased almost entirely (save for regional opt-outs on Radio 4 until 1980), and all television and radio production for national networks was transferred to the separate BBC Birmingham network production centre.

The cost of television production technology decreased throughout the 1980s and 1990s and this had several effects on the BBC in the Midlands. Smaller, more local channels became viable. The BBC's Midlands coverage had long been accused of being excessively Birmingham-centric, and in 1991, television broadcasting from the Waltham transmitting station and the BBC Radio Leicester, BBC Radio Nottingham and BBC Radio Derby radio stations were given over to a new Nottingham-based BBC East Midlands.

A more radical move in this direction took place in 2006 when the West Midlands Region piloted the BBC's Local TV initiative, with television news programmes produced for six local areas, all much smaller than the traditional TV regions, and in the case of Birmingham and the Black Country, even smaller than those covered by local radio stations. This programming was broadcast on digital television and over the internet only. The experiment came to an end as planned in September 2006 and has not been repeated since.

On the 15 January 2021, BBC Radio launched a new temporary station called BBC Radio Wolverhampton.

Studios

The first studios used by BBC Midlands were offices and a small studio in Broad Street, Birmingham; however these became too small for the expanding region. Regional News remained at Broad Street until 1971, the small studio being ideal for news bulletins, while other productions took place in a former cinema in Gosta Green and a regency mansion in Carpenter Road, Edgbaston.

In 1971, all of these operations were condensed into a new integrated studio complex, Pebble Mill Studios. Pebble Mill became iconic because it featured in some of the most popular programming of the 1970s. Pebble Mill had two studios, studio A for major productions and studio B, for Midlands Today and other local programming. When the complex was built it was intended that there should be a studio C for drama production; however this never happened, and instead the foyer of the building was used as an extra studio, complete with the gallery and facilities built in for studio C. A conservatory studio was also built that held Good Morning with Anne and Nick for many years. The new studios encompassed network and regional productions and radio, and was the Headquarters for BBC English Regions.

By the 1990s, change meant Pebble Mill's future was uncertain. Advances in technology made outside broadcasts cheaper and much more common, while also increasing the scope for independent and outsourced television production. In combination these meant that much television programming could increasingly be produced without the need for the sort of large integrated studio complexes represented by Pebble Mill. In addition, the building was getting costly to heat and maintain. In 2000, studio A was closed following the need to make savings at the corporation, and plans were made to dispose of Pebble Mill.

In 2004, productions split two ways. BBC West Midlands, Midlands Today, BBC WM, BBC English Regions and the network production base BBC Birmingham moved to The Mailbox in Birmingham city centre, with many of the productions moving to the BBC Drama Village. The Mailbox contains the studios, newsroom and radio facilities, all of which have windows allowing the public to view how their television and radio is made.

It was announced in August 2022, that BBC Birmingham will leave The Mailbox for the new creative quarter in Digbeth, Birmingham from 2026. The new broadcast centre will occupy the former Tyhpoo Tea factory. By then in adjacent studios the BBC’s flagship show Masterchef would have already taken up residence. The move coincides with BBC’s lease at The Mailbox coming to an end having been located there since the move from Pebble Mill in 2004.

See also

BBC English Regions

References and further reading

References

External links

West Midlands
Mass media in Birmingham, West Midlands
Television channels and stations established in 1949